Misima Airport  is an airport serving the Misima Island, in the Milne Bay Province of Papua New Guinea.

Airlines and destinations

References

External links
 
 

Airports in Papua New Guinea
Milne Bay Province